The White Line, also known as Line 7, was a proposed line of the Montreal Metro that never made it past its planning stage.

The White Line was first proposed by the Commission de transport de Montréal (CTM) during the initial planning for the Montreal Metro in 1953, and in 1970 the Communauté urbaine de Montréal (CUM) proposed an extension of the Green Line to Montréal-Nord. In September 1983, the Bureau des Transports de Montréal (BTM) proposed a new north-south Line 7 consisting of ten stations, from Pie-IX to Léger, under Boulevard Pie-IX, through Saint-Léonard and north-east towards Rivière-des-Prairies. A year later, at the start of 1984, it was formally proposed by the Communauté urbaine de Montréal (CUM), with 12 stations (from Pie-IX to Maurice-Duplessis/Langelier).

For nearly a decade during the 1980s and 1990s, the line appeared on all official Métro maps, coloured white, so it received the unofficial nickname of "White line". Other nicknames include "Pie-IX line".

The Métro system has another projected subway line, Line 6, whose number was reserved for a surface line proposed by the Ministère des Transports du Québec (MTQ) along the northern shore of the island, but it was never shown on a system map.

Detailed studies on Line 7 are archived at the Grande Bibliothèque, covering the proposed route, station location options, ridership flux, and so on.

See also
 Red Line (Montreal Metro)
 Line 6 (Montreal Metro)
 Pink Line (Montreal Metro)

References

Montreal Metro
Unbuilt buildings and structures in Canada
Cancelled rapid transit lines and systems
Cancelled projects in Canada